Hedypnois rhagadioloides, the Cretanweed or scaly hawkbit, is a species of plant in the tribe Cichorieae within the family Asteraceae. It is native to the Mediterranean Region and neighboring areas from Canary Islands to Iran, and naturalized in Australia and in parts of the Americas (southwestern United States, Baja California in Mexico, central Chile).

Hedypnois rhagadioloides is a variably hairy/hispid annual herb with flower stalks up to 40 centimeter (16 inches) stall, most of the leaves gathered around the base resembling the common dandelion except for the bristles. Leaves are green or purplish, up to 18 centimeters (7.2 inches) long. The plant produces a flower stalk with one single flower head or a flat-topped array of several heads. The head has rows of phyllaries that may be very bristly, and the head is egg-shaped when still closed. Each head contains 8-30 yellow ray flowers but no disc flowers.

References

External links
photo of herbarium specimen at Missouri Botanical Garden, collected in Macedonia
Tela Botanica in French with photos and French distribution map
On-line Flora of Malta many photos
Flora Silvestre, Hedypnois rhagadioloides (L.) Schmidt
Jepson Manual Treatment

Plants described in 1753
Taxa named by Carl Linnaeus
Cichorieae
Flora of Malta